ZM is a New Zealand contemporary hit radio network owned by New Zealand Media and Entertainment. It broadcasts 19 markets throughout mainland New Zealand via terrestrial FM, and worldwide via the Internet. The network targets the 15–39 demographic specialises in a chart-music playlist of pop, rock, hip hop and dance music. It reaches approximately 486,800 listeners weekly, making it the fifth largest commercial radio station in New Zealand.

The ZM network as it is today was founded in the early 1970s as three separate commercial music stations owned by Radio New Zealand in Auckland, Wellington and Christchurch. The name is derived from the former callsigns of the stations: 1ZM, 2ZM and 3ZM. The stations were carved off to The Radio Network (now merged into New Zealand Media and Entertainment) in 1996, and ZM spread across the country, originally as three separate networks before finally merging to form one nationwide network in 2000.

The network's head office and main studios are based in Auckland, where all of the programming is produced.

ZM history

Early years
ZM in its current format was first started in 1973 by the government owned New Zealand Broadcasting Corporation (which became Radio New Zealand in 1975). The three original ZM stations were based in Auckland, Wellington and Christchurch and had been on air for the past few decades most recently as 1YD, 2YD and 3ZM in their respective markets.
The three original stations were known by their ZM call signs, 1ZM in Auckland on 1250AM, 2ZM in Wellington on 1130AM and 3ZM in Christchurch on 1400AM.
In 1978 the AM frequency step in New Zealand was changed from a 10 kHz step to a 9 kHz step as a result all three stations changed frequencies. 1ZM moved to 1251 kHz, 2ZM Wellington moved to 1161 kHz but sometimes branded as 1162ZM and 3ZM Christchurch moved to 1323 kHz.

1980s

Overnight programming
In 1981, Radio New Zealand stations were finally granted the right to broadcast 24 hours per day; previously only the domain of private operators. Overnight networked programming was introduced with the ZM All-Nighter show. Programming was produced from the 1ZM studios in Auckland and networked to 2ZM Wellington and 3ZM Christchurch. 2ZK in Hawkes Bay and 4ZG in Gore also took the ZM All-Nighter. Programming was also networked to the ZMFM station introduced in Palmerston North in 1987. The show was offered as an 'alternative music choice to the top 40-based formats offered by the private stations and was originally hosted by Barry Jenkin from Auckland. With his departure in 1983, the alternative format remained, but the music played was more top-40-based with the large percentage of NZ music. In 1987 with 1ZM dropping the ZM brand name The ZM All Nighter became known as "The All Nighter" on all stations. In 1989 The All Nighter was discontinued and stations that previously took this show now ran local shows or an automated show with no announcer.

Auckland 1ZM becomes Classic Hits
 In 1982, 1ZM Auckland lost its bid for an FM license and with the Broadcasting Tribunal allowing two new private radio stations (Magic 91FM and 89 Stereo FM) into the Auckland market, 1ZM was required to re format and adopt a 'Limited Sponsorship' model in place of its full commercial licence. This was an attempt to assist the new operators in establishing a revenue base. For 1ZM this meant that although the station could still run paid-for advertisements, those messages could not have music underneath, mention price or be longer than 25 words. Within 2–3 years, both 1ZM's financial and audience market share dropped significantly as advertisers and young listeners were attracted by the higher quality sound of the FM stations, despite the absence of long commercial breaks on 1ZM. 1ZM at the time promoted itself as "Total Music ZM" to emphasise the limited commercial format.
 By 1987 1ZM Auckland was still a limited commercial station. A decision was made to change the format of 1ZM from a Contemporary Hit Radio format to a Classic Hits format. The Auckland station was rebranded as Classic Hits Twelve 51 which subsequently marked the birth of the Classic Hits brand which would be rolled out across New Zealand years later.
 In 1989 Auckland's Classic Hits Twelve 51 was finally given a licence to broadcast on FM and broadcast commercials. The station launched on 97.4FM as Classic Hits 97FM. The 1251 kHz frequency licence was transferred to Christian broadcaster Radio Rhema. In 1993 the format of Classic Hits 97FM was rolled out across New Zealand with local stations operated by Radio New Zealand taking on the same format and branding, ultimately all these stations became the Classic Hits network in 2001, and later The Hits network in 2014.

Wellington 2ZM and Christchurch 3ZM switch to FM
The ZM stations in Christchurch and Wellington were not affected by the changes made to the Auckland station. In 1985 2ZM Wellington switched to FM broadcasting on 90.9FM and in 1986 Christchurch also made the move to FM broadcasting on 91.3FM. Following the change, both stations rebranded to become Hit Radio ZMFM. 
In 1987 a ZMFM station was established in Palmerston North on 90.6FM with a local breakfast show, but all programming outside breakfast was networked from Wellington. This station became a local station in 1989 branded as 2QQ.
In 1989 ZMFM Christchurch became known as 91 Stereo ZM and later 91ZM.

1990s

Branding
Both 91ZM Christchurch and ZMFM Wellington used the slogan "Rock of the Nineties" during the early 1990s. In late 1994 ZMFM Wellington was rebranded to 91ZM using the same logo as 91ZM Christchurch. Both stations changed the slogan to "Just Great Music of the 80s and 90s".
In 1997 ZM changed their logo on all stations to include a green globe behind the station name. At the same time the station slogan was changed to Today's Hit Music reflecting the modern music played on the station, this slogan was used until 2014.

Privatisation
In July 1996 the New Zealand Government sold off the commercial arm of Radio New Zealand, which included, among other things, the ZM stations. The new owner was The Radio Network, a subsidiary of APN News & Media and Clear Channel Communications, which operated as a division of the Australian Radio Network.

Expansion and early network programming
A new ZM station was established in Northland in 1995 as 93ZM this station was a completely local station at this point.
The very first networked ZM station was established in Dunedin in 1996 as 96ZM, this station was networked from 91ZM studios in Christchurch using an automated computer system allowing announcers in Christchurch to produce localised voice breaks for Dunedin recorded minutes earlier. On air announcers called the station Dunedin's 96ZM but during shows with a high amount of talk such as breakfast one voice break was produced for both Dunedin and Christchurch where the station was simply called ZM.  
In 1997 programming was extended to Invercargill on 95.6FM as 96ZM, networked from 91ZM Christchurch with localised voice breaks, the same as 96ZM Dunedin. Also in 1997 ZM returned to Palmerston North on the 90.6FM frequency that had been used to broadcast ZMFM to Palmerston North in the late 1980s. 91ZM Palmerston North took network programming from 91ZM Wellington with localised voice breaks similar to Dunedin and Invercargill.
In late 1996 The Radio Network purchased the assets of Prospect Media, which included Radio Hauraki and Easy Listening i. The sale also included local stations in Auckland and Hamilton which at the time were both branded as The Breeze, and were separately owned from The Breeze station in Wellington. In 1997 both The Breeze in Auckland and Hamilton were closed down and a new local ZM station was started in Auckland on 91.0FM as 91ZM, a ZM station was also started on 89.8FM in Hamilton as 89.8ZM
In 1997 local programming was dropped on 93ZM Northland excluding the breakfast show with all other programming becoming networked from Auckland. The Northland breakfast team were moved to Hamilton in 1998 with programming networked back to Northland, at other times both stations carried 91ZM Auckland programming.
Programming was extended to Rotorua in 1998 as 98ZM replacing local station Classic Rock 98.3FM, initially a local ZM station but later networked from Auckland. A new station was also established in Taranaki as 98.8ZM.
In 1999 programming was extended to Hawkes Bay on the former Radio Hauraki 95.9FM frequency. Previously this frequency was used for Classic Rock 96FM.
Nationwide networked programming was introduced in 1997 first with the ZM Essential 30 Countdown on Saturday afternoons. Shortly after the ZM Club Mix was introduced on Saturday nights.
A nationwide night show was introduced on weeknights in 1998, 91ZM Christchurch announcer Willy Macalister was moved to Auckland to present this show.

2000s

Nationwide Network programming
By 2000 ZM was broadcasting in Invercargill and Dunedin networked from Christchurch, Palmerston North networked from Wellington and had established a northern network with Hawkes Bay, Rotorua, Taranaki, Waikato and Northland all receiving networked programming from Auckland. The Waikato programme could also be heard in the Bay of Plenty.
In 2000 ZM changed to a single network format, all ZM stations in smaller regions became part of this network based from Auckland the only regions not originally affected were Christchurch and Wellington where these stations remained local except during the evenings and overnight where ZM ran a nationwide night show. Voice breaks that were previously prerecorded for each region and targeted towards the local audience were replaced with live voice breaks tailored to a nationwide audience. At first, these changes were not popular particularly in regions where the announcer lineup changed due to receiving the Auckland-based ZM station instead of the Wellington or Christchurch based station. The original nationwide network lineup consisted of Marcus Lush on breakfast with The Marcus Lush breakfast show, Nicki Sunderland and Lana Coc-Kroft presenting the daytime show, Mike McClung and Tim Homer presenting drive and Geoff Stagg on nights. 
In 2001 more changes were made and this time Christchurch and Wellington were integrated into the network. The Christchurch studio was closed altogether with 91ZM Christchurch drive announcer Jason Royal and producer Jason Winstanley (Staino) moved to Auckland to present a nationwide drive show. Wellington ZM remained local but local Wellington breakfast announcers Polly Gillespie, Nick Tansley and Grant Kareama became the hosts of a new nationwide breakfast show still presented from Wellington. At first some breakfast show content in Wellington varied to the rest of the country such as separate news bulletins and the final hour of the show only being heard in Wellington, by 2002 the breakfast show was the same in all regions.
In 2003 more changes were made to the announcer lineup. The Radio Network hired shock jock Iain Stables to present the ZM drive show with Jason Royal moved to the daytime show. Former 2XS FM Palmerston North announcer Stu Tolan was hired to present the night show and later Jacqui Jenson became co-host. Later in 2003 the amount of local content on ZM in Wellington was reduced after Wellington drive announcer Julian Burn left, and he was not replaced but instead the nationwide drive show, then hosted by Iain Stables, was networked into Wellington. Local weekend programming in Wellington was also reduced in 2005.
In 2005 the ZM Christchurch studio was reopened and ZM was local in Christchurch during the Daytime (10 am–3 pm), as well as between 10 am–2 pm on Saturdays. The Daytime 10 am–3 pm announcer in Auckland produced two separate shows simultaneously, one exclusively for Auckland and another for the rest of the ZM Network, a technique used by various other Auckland radio stations including Classic Hits FM, The Breeze & Coast.
At the end of 2008 Wellington dropped its local daytime and Saturday brunch show and now takes the network versions of these shows, and exactly the same changes affected ZM Christchurch during the middle of 2009. This saw the Christchurch studio facing closure, however the Wellington studio remained until 2014 as it housed the nationwide ZM Morning Crew then presented by Polly and Grant.
 Several new stations have been set up to carry network programming. Early network stations include ZM Gisborne in 2002, ZM Wanganui in 2004, and ZM South Canterbury in September 2004. Later network stations include ZM Blenheim in 2007, ZM Wairarapa in 2010, ZM Taupo in 2013, ZM Queenstown in May 2014, ZM West Coast in 2020 and ZM Coromandel in 2021.

2010s

Launch of online content
Early internet streams of ZM date back to the late 1990s when 91ZM Wellington had an internet stream available on their website. For most of the 2000s the Auckland, Wellington and Christchurch stations could be streamed online. In December 2010, the station launched a new online stream of ZM, where in a New Zealand radio first, the stream became the 20th ZM station to connect to the network in the same way regional markets do. The change meant ZM Online now had its own imaging & commercials. Local ads, weather and traffic were removed from the online station.
ZM launched its own iPhone App in 2011. The app displayed all of the ZM website content, and also streamed the station live. An Android app was later launched.
In line with all TRN stations ZM became available on iHeartRadio after its New Zealand launch in August 2013.

Change in format and announcer lineup
In April 2014 it was announced that long standing breakfast hosts Polly Gillespie & Grant Kereama (Over 20 Years in Wellington Market & 13 Years Nationally) were stepping aside from the station in order to continue their show on the new Radio Network station The Hits. Their last show on the station was on 24 April. Their replacements were immediately announced as the high-profile signings of Carl Fletcher, Vaughan Smith & Megan Papas who defected from rival station The Edge.
In April 2014 the ZM network named The Fletch, Vaughan & Megan Show as their new breakfast show. It consists of Carl Fletcher, Vaughan Smith and Megan Papas.
The show shuffle also saw the Ad-Free 50s being dropped.
The ZM30 (formerly the daily ZM20) on Juice TV hosted by Guy and Georgia Saturday 6pm and Sunday 9am finished screening when Juice was replaced by Garage TV on 15 May 2015
Jay and Flynny finished their show on 19 December 2014 after six years together and Flynny being on ZM for over a decade. They were replaced by Jase & PJ. 
In December 2016, it was announced that The Night Show with Guy and Georgia would be replaced by The ZM Snapchart with Cam Mansel.
At the end of 2017, Jase & PJ departed the drive show. Until July 2018 the ZM Drive show consisted of edited best bits of their Breakfast show from Australia on KIIS 101.1.
In July 2018, Bree & Clint replaced the pre-recorded best bits of Jase & PJ. The Jase & PJ highlight clip show had been moved to Saturday and Sunday mornings (which have now been terminated)
In December 2020, with the announcement of Megan Papas’ pregnancy came the announcement that comedian Hayley Sproull would temporarily take the place of Megan Papas until May 2021.
In 2021, ZM rebranded its night show to the ZM’s Late Show, still presented by Cam Mansel, as well as adding a new ZM’s Late Late Show presented by Meg Wyatt and Ella Shepherd.
In December 2021, it was announced that Megan Papas would move to The Hits starting Feb 1st, and would be on leave until then. Hayley Sproull will join Carl Fletcher, Vaughan Smith for the breakfast show from 2022, although it was unclear if Hayley will be the permanent replacement for Megan.

Broadcasting

North Island

 ZM Whangarei - Northland 
 ZM Auckland - Auckland 
 ZM Waikato - Hamilton 
 Waihi - 
 Waihi Beach - 
 Coromandel - , 
 Thames - 
 Paeroa - 
 Tauranga - 
 Rotorua - 
 Taupo - 
 Gisborne - , 
 Hawke's Bay - 
 Taranaki - 
 Whanganui - 
 Manawatu - 
 Kapiti Coast and Horowhenua - 
 Wairarapa - 
 ZM Wellington - Wellington and Hutt Valley -

South Island

 Nelson - 
 Marlborough - 
 Westport - 
 Greymouth - 
 ZM Christchurch - Christchurch - , Sumner - 
 Timaru - 
 Dunedin - 
 Queenstown - 
 Wanaka - 
 Invercargill -

ZMonline
In early December 2010, ZM relaunched its online stream as a new station, rather than relaying an existing station as it had done previously. It became the 20th ZM station to connect to the network in the same way regional markets do. This gave ZMonline its own imaging & commercial options.

Local ads, weather and traffic are removed from the online station (as these are available on demand for every market inside the ZM iPhone and android apps). At the moment through every second commercial break the station plays a song.

ZM News Service
Like most radio stations in New Zealand ZM originally featured news on the hour every hour originally news was provided by the Radio New Zealand News Service, following the sale of the Radio New Zealand commercial service this became The Radio Network News Service. In 1997 ZM stations began reducing news breaks to only play on the breakfast show, this was at time when some radio stations began increasing the amount of music played in an hour and reducing talk. In 2000 ZM started their own news service called ZM Newsbeat.

The news service (formally called Newsbeat and Newsfeed) has news reports read out and local weather forecast prerecorded from the Auckland studio for each individual region. The bulletins are sourced from the NZME newsroom, and air hourly during weekdays between 6am-12pm with Rachel Jackson-Lees, and 1pm-6pm with Lee Plummer, with news and weather hourly 7am-10am during the weekend and public holidays. An exclusive Wellington edition of ZM Newsbeat was aired during the Morning Crew's show up until early 2006, when it was dropped for the national edition. In April 2014 Newsbeat was renamed to Newsfeed coinciding with the re-launch of ZM, at the same time the Newsfeed service was introduced on The Hits with the former ZM news readers moved over to The Hits.

Traffic reports are read out on air from The Radio Network Auckland studios for larger regions in New Zealand, for Auckland, Wellington, Christchurch, Hamilton, Tauranga and Dunedin. Other stations play advertisements during these times. Wellington originally ran their own local traffic reports until 2006.

Weather is read out on weekdays following news bulletins. Individual weather reports are pre-recorded for each region and updated with each show. When the Morning Crew were based in Wellington, they read out the Wellington weather live during the breakfast show, while the pre-recorded reports by the newsreader air over the rest of the network.

ZM in the New Zealand Radio Awards
ZM and ZM announcers have won the following awards at the New Zealand Radio Awards:

2005
Special Commendation went to announcer Sarah Gandy for the ZM Sealed Section in the category Best Daily Or Weekly Series

2006
Best New Broadcaster: Sarah Gandy, 91ZM Auckland and ZM Network
Best Promotional Or Image Trailer for a Radio Station: One Hit Wonder-U2 - Chris Nicoll, ZM Network
Station Imaging: ZM Network Imaging - Chris Nicoll, ZM
Commercial or Trailers: One Hit Wonder, U2 - Chris Nicoll, ZM

2007
Best Music Breakfast Host or Hosts (Metropolitan): The ZM Morning Crew
Best Non-Breakfast Host or Hosts (Metropolitan): Stables, ZM Network
Best Promotion of a Radio Station (Networks): Live Rent Free – Christian Boston & Kate McGowan, ZM Network
Best Client Promotion: Telecom 3 Minute Hour – Leanne Hutchinson, ZM Network
Best Promotional Or Image Trailer for a Radio Station: Carrot Fest – Chris Nicoll, ZM
Also Special Commendation goes to ZM Programme Director, Christian Boston in the category of Programmer of the Year.

2008
Best Client Promotion: 0800 New Cops – Leanne Hutchinson and Cam Bisley, ZM Network
Best Promotional Trailer Live Rent Free - Chris Nicoll, ZM Network
Programmer of the Year: Christian Boston - ZM Network
Associated Craft Award: Sarah Catran - ZM and Flava Sales
Station of the Year - Metropolitan: ZM Auckland (accepted by Programme Director Christian Boston)

2009
Best Client Promotion: 24/7 with The Phoenix XI – Anna Skinner & Casey Sullivan – ZM Wellington
Best Promotional Trailer: The Timbaland Trip – Chris Nicoll – ZM Network
Programmer of the Year: Christian Boston – ZM Network
Station Imaging: ZM Network Imaging – Chris Nicoll – ZM Network

2012
Best Client Promotion:- ZM's Hot Chicks – Anna Skinner & Christian Boston – ZM Network
Best Promotional Trailer: Top 100 of 2011 – Kieran Bell – ZM Network

2017 
 Station of the Year - Network: ZM

2018 
 Best Music Breakfast Show: Fletch, Vaughan & Megan

2019
 Best New Broadcaster - On Air: Anna Henvest – ZM News / Announcer – ZM Network
 Best Music Breakfast Show - Network: ZM's Fletch, Vaughan & Megan - Carl Fletcher, Vaughan Smith, Megan Papas, Caitlin Marett, James Johnston, Anna Henvest - ZM Network.
 Best Client Promotion/Activation - Single Market: Fletch, Vaughan & Megan's Car Raffle - Ruby Bain, Mary Outram, Jimmy Farrant, Caitlin Marett, Anna Henvest, James Johnston, Carl Fletcher, Vaughan Smith, Megan Papas, Jordyn Mihell - ZM Christchurch
 Best Marketing Campaign - Friday Jams LIVE - Jacqui Robins, Emily Hancox, Ross Flahive, Dannii Gardiner, Ashleigh Van Graan - ZM Network
 Best Network Station Promotion - ZM's Secret Sound - ZM Network Team - ZM Network
 Best Station Imaging - Alistair Cockburn - ZM Network
 Best Station Trailer - Alistair Cockburn - ZM Network
 "The Blackie Award' - Fletch Vaughan Meghan's Final Conversion - Carl Fletcher, Vaughan Smith, Megan Papas, Caitlin Marett, James Johnston, Anna Henvest - ZM Network
 Station of the Year - Network: ZM Network

Slogans
ZM has used the following slogans in the past:
 
c1985–c1988:
 Hit Radio ZMFM (Wellington, Christchurch and Manawatu)
 
c1988–c1988:
 More Music ZMFM (Manawatu only)
 
c1988–c1990:
 The Music Leader ZMFM (Wellington and Manawatu only)
 
c1988–c1990:
 91 Stereo ZM (Christchurch only)
 
1991–1994:
 Rock of the Nineties ZMFM (Wellington only)
 
1991–1994:
 Rock of the Nineties 91ZM (Christchurch only)
 
1994–1997:
 Just Great Music of the '80s and '90s
 
1997–2014:
 Today's Hit Music
 
2014:
 Fletch, Vaughan and Megan & Hot Tunes or NZ's Hit Music
 
2015:
 ZM Is My Station!
 
2016–2022:
 Hit Music Lives Here
 
2020–present:
 Play ZM

References

External links
 ZM Online
 ZM Corporate Profile